

d
D.H.E. 45

da

dab-dam
dabelotine (INN)
dabigatran (USAN)
dabuzalgron (USAN)
dacarbazine (INN)
dacemazine (INN)
dacetuzumab (USAN, INN)
dacisteine (INN)
daclizumab (INN)
dacopafant (INN)
dactinomycin (INN)
dacuronium bromide (INN)
dagapamil (INN)
dalanated insulin (INN)
dalbavancin (USAN)
dalbraminol (INN)
dalcetrapib (USAN, INN)
dalcotidine (INN)
daledalin (INN)
dalfampridine (USAN)
dalfopristin (INN)
Dalgan. Redirects to Dezocine.
Dalmane
dalotuzumab (INN, USAN)
dalteparin sodium (INN)
daltroban (INN)
dalvastatin (INN)
dametralast (INN)
damotepine (INN)

dan-dap
danaparoid sodium (INN)
danazol (INN)
danegaptide (USAN, INN)
daniplestim (INN)
daniquidone (INN)
danitracen (INN)
Danocrine
danofloxacin (INN)
danoprevir (INN)
danosteine (INN)
Dantrium
dantrolene (INN)
dantron (INN)
dapabutan (INN)
dapiglifozin (USAN)
dapiclermin (USAN, (INN))
dapiprazole (INN)
dapitant (INN)
dapoxetine (INN)
dapsone (INN)
daptomycin (INN)

dar-day
Daranide
darapladib (USAN, INN)
daratumumab (INN)
Daraprim
darbepoetin alfa (INN)
Darbid. Redirects to Isopropamide.
darenzepine (INN)
darexaban (INN)
darglitazone (INN)
Daricon
darifenacin (INN)
darinaparsin (USAN, INN)
darodipine (INN)
darotropium bromide (USAN, INN)
darsidomine (INN)
Darunavir
darunavir (USAN)
Darvocet (Xanodyne Pharmaceuticals)
Darvon (Eli Lilly and Company)
darifenacin hydrochloride (USAN)
dasatinib (USAN, INN)
datelliptium chloride (INN)
DaTSCAN (GE Healthcare)
Daunorubicin (Bedford Labs)
daunorubicin (INN)
Daunoxome
davalintide (USAN, INN)
davunetide (USAN, INN)
Daypro (Pfizer)

daz
dazadrol (INN)
dazepinil (INN)
dazidamine (INN)
dazmegrel (INN)
dazolicine (INN)
dazopride (INN)
dazoquinast (INN)
dazoxiben (INN)

dd
DDAVP (Sanofi-Aventis) redirects to desmopressin